Paminivandlavooru is a village in Mangalapalle Panchayat which is located in Bangarupalyam mandal belonging to Chittoor district of Andhra Pradesh state in southern India.

References

Villages in Chittoor district